Dheeba Nazir (born 1988) is a Kashmiri-language writer hailing from Srinagar, Jammu and Kashmir, India. She is the first girl from Srinagar who got Yuva puruskar Sahitya Akademi Award for her book Zareen Zakham.

Dheeba holds post-graduation in Kashmiri literature, Urdu literature, and in education. She also has done her research on Rupa Bhawani (17th century mystic poet).She is married and has one son and two twin daughters.(source:trust me bro)

Awards 
 Sahitya Akademi Award

References 

Living people
1998 births
Kashmiri writers
Kashmiri people